John Rhys Plumlee (born January 2, 2001) is an American football quarterback and wide receiver for the UCF Knights. He formerly played for Ole Miss and was a center fielder for the Ole Miss baseball team.

Early life and high school
Plumlee grew up in Hattiesburg, Mississippi and attended Oak Grove High School, where he played baseball and football. He became the Warriors starting quarterback as a sophomore. As a junior, he passed for 1,759 yards, 14 touchdowns and nine interceptions and  rushed for 599 yards and eight touchdowns in nine games and was named to the "Dandy Dozen" by The Clarion-Ledger. In baseball, he batted .442 with 35 RBIs and 38 runs scored in 27 games. Rated a four star recruit, Plumlee initially committed to play college football at Georgia during the summer going into his senior year over offers from Auburn, Alabama, Notre Dame, North Carolina, Nebraska, Southern Miss, Tulane, Troy, South Alabama and Mississippi State.

As a senior, Plumlee complete 187-of-291 passes (64.3 percent) for 2,834 yards with 33 touchdown passes and three interceptions while also rushing for 1,444 yards and 19 touchdowns on 162 carries (8.9 yards per carry) and led the team to a Southern State championship before losing to Horn Lake High School. He finished his high school career with 5,430 passing yards, 2,314 rushing yards and 82 total touchdowns in three seasons. After the season, Plumlee de-committed from Georgia shortly before National Signing Day in order to accept as scholarship to play both football and baseball at Ole Miss. Plumlee batted .411 with 39 hits, 45 runs scored, seven doubles, five triples, two home runs and 24 RBI in 29 games and was named 2019 5A/6A All-State in his final baseball season at Oak Grove.

College career

Ole Miss
Plumlee began his true freshman season in 2019 as the Rebels' backup quarterback. He made his collegiate debut against California after an injury to starter Matt Corral, completing all seven of his passes for 82 yards and rushing three times for 53 yards as he led the team to a near-comeback win before being stopped at California's one-yard line as time expired. Plumlee made his first career start the following week on September 28, 2019, against Alabama, completing 35.7 percent of his passes for 141 yards with two touchdowns and one interception and also rushing 109 yards and one touchdown in a 59–31 loss. He was named the Southeastern Conference (SEC) Freshman of the Week after rushing for 165 yards and a touchdown with 99 passing yards against Vanderbilt on October 5. On November 10 against New Mexico State, Plumlee broke the freshman rushing yards and rushing touchdown record with 177 yards on the ground and two touchdowns. Plumlee finished the season with 910 yards, four touchdowns and three interceptions on 79-for-150 passing (52.7 percent) while rushing 154 times for 1,023 yards and 12 touchdowns. He set Ole Miss records for rushing yards, rushing touchdowns and total touchdowns by a freshman and the most rushing yards in a season by a quarterback.

Plumlee began his freshman baseball season as the Rebels' starting centerfielder, while playing in the same outfield as football teammate Jerrion Ealy. He had one hit in 16 at-bats before the season was cut short due to the coronavirus pandemic.

Going into his sophomore season, Corral was named the Rebels' starting quarterback over Plumlee. Plumlee continued to be used in package plays while also serving as the backup quarterback. He also occasionally lined up at wide receiver and saw significant time at the position in the Rebels' 26–20 win over Indiana in the 2021 Outback Bowl, catching five passes for 73 yards. Plumlee finished the season with 65 passing yards with one touchdown pass, 94 rushing yards, and six receptions for 79 yards in six games. In baseball, he batted .267 with four doubles, one home run, 21 runs scored, and seven RBIs.

Plumlee entered his junior season listed as a wide receiver. He finished the season with 19 receptions for 201 yards and 72 rushing yards on nine carries. Plumlee announced that he would be entering the transfer portal following Ole Miss's appearance in the 2022 Sugar Bowl.

UCF
Plumlee announced his commitment to transfer to UCF on January 9, 2022. He also committed to play for the  UCF baseball team, but his waiver to play in the 2022 season was denied by the NCAA. Plumlee was named the Knights starting quarterback going into the 2022 season. He tied a school record with seven total touchdowns after he completed 18 of 22 pass attempts for 373 yards and four touchdowns and rushed seven times for 37 yards and three touchdowns in a 70-13 win over Temple on October 13, 2022. Plumlee finished the season with 218 completions on 346 pass attempts for 2,586 yards with 14 touchdowns and eight interceptions while also rushing for 862 yards and 11 touchdowns.

Plumlee entered the 2023 UCF baseball season as a starting outfielder.

Statistics

References

External links

Ole Miss Rebels baseball bio
Ole Miss Rebels football bio
UCF Knights baseball bio
UCF Knights football bio

2001 births
Living people
American football quarterbacks
Baseball outfielders
Ole Miss Rebels baseball players
Ole Miss Rebels football players
Players of American football from Mississippi
Sportspeople from Hattiesburg, Mississippi
UCF Knights football players
UCF Knights baseball players